Abraham John Valpy (178619 November 1854) was an English printer and publisher.

Life
He was the son of the Reading schoolmaster Richard Valpy and was born in that town. He is remembered in connection with two great undertakings in the department of classical literature. These were reissues of (1) Stephanus' Greek Thesaurus, for which E. H. Barker was chiefly responsible; and (2) Valpy's Delphin Classics in 143 volumes with text drawn from the 18th century French Delphin Classics (Ad usum Delphini) series and with variorum notes, under the editorial superintendence of George Dyer. He also founded the Classical Journal in 1810.

Notes

References
William Prideaux Courtney, Valpy, Abraham John (DNB00), Dictionary of National Biography, London: Smith, Elder & Co., 1885–1900, Volume 58; revised edition of entry published as:

External links

1787 births
1854 deaths
British book publishers (people)
English printers
People from Reading, Berkshire
Valpy-Fulton-Jeffreys family
19th-century British businesspeople